Đorđe Pavlić (28 August 1938 – 9 May 2015) was a Serbian football striker.

References

External links
 Đorđe Pavlić at Serbian federation 

1938 births
2015 deaths
Serbian footballers
Yugoslav footballers
Yugoslavia international footballers
Yugoslav First League players
FK Vojvodina players
Bundesliga players
MSV Duisburg players
Serbian expatriate footballers
Expatriate footballers in Germany
Olympic footballers of Yugoslavia
Footballers at the 1964 Summer Olympics
Sportspeople from Šabac
Association football forwards